Hate is a blackened death metal band from Poland. The band was formed in 1990 by guitarist and vocalist Adam "ATF Sinner" Buszko, guitarist Quack and drummer Mittloff. The band lineup has changed many times over the years, and currently consists solely of Adam Buszko and drummer Paweł Jaroszewicz. They have released twelve full-length studio albums to date, as well as a number of early demos and EPs. Their most recent album, Rugia, was released on October 15, 2021 through Metal Blade Records.

Biography
Hate was formed in Warsaw, Poland, in 1990 by guitarist and vocalist Adam The First Sinner, guitarist Qack and drummer Mittloff. Between 1990 and 1995 the band recorded three demo tapes: Aborrence (1992), Evil Art (1994) and Unwritten Law (1995). Bassist Daniel Rutkowski was first heard on Evil Art. In 1996 Hate signed their first record contract with a small underground label, Novum Vox Mortiis, who released their first two albums, Daemon Qui Fecit Terram (1996) and Lord Is Avenger (1998) in Poland.

In 2000, Hate released the mini-album Victims through larger Polish label Metal Mind Records. Later that year, gigs with Immolation brought the band to the attention of American label Dwell Records, who included Hate's cover version of "Postmortem" on the compilation Gateways To Hell: Tribute To Slayer (Vol. 2).  This led to Hate signing their first record contract outside their homeland with WW3/Mercenary Music who released a compilation of the albums Lord Is Avenger and Victims as Holy Dead Trinity in 2001.

2002 saw the release of Hate's next album, Cain's Way, on WW3/Mercenary Music in the US, and on Blackend Records in Europe, though released several months later. At the time of the European release the band underwent a change in line-up, with guitarist Ralph and drummer Mittloff replaced by Kaos and Hellrizer, respectively.

In 2004 Hate released Awakening Of The Liar on Listenable Records in Europe and Mercenary Music in the US. The album was a poll winner in Polish magazine Thrash'Em All.

The band recorded their fifth full-length album Anaclasis – A Haunting Gospel of Malice & Hatred in June and July 2005 at Hertz Studio in Białystok, Poland. The album was released on October 25, 2005 through Empire Records. The album received positive reviews from music critics, with Blabbermouth writing that the music "is indicative of a band that has formed an identity. It is well structured, yet not overly technical, and sports a bit more melody and a cleaner guitar sound."

The band entered Hertz Studio in August 2007 to record their sixth full-length album, Morphosis, which was released on February 4, 2008 through Listenable Records. The album received positive reviews from music critics.

The band's seventh full-length album, Erebos, was released on November 15, 2010 through Listenable Records. The album was recorded between July and August 2010 at Hertz Studio. A music video for the title-track was directed by Sławomir Makowski and released on October 21, 2011.

Their eighth full-length album, Solarflesh, was released on February 4, 2013 through Napalm Records. The album was recorded between June–July 2012 at Sound Division Studio in Warsaw, Poland, and mixed at Hertz Studio. The album received generally positive reviews from music critics. Revolver Magazine gave it 4/5, writing that the band have "nailed the best of modern no-frills death metal: full-speed blast beats, grimy sludge, and just enough experimentation to keep things interesting, from keyboard flourishes and a sense of drama that borders on ludicrous but still works to Spanish-style guitar intro to the title track."

During the night of April 5, 2013, and the morning of April 6, 2013, bassist Slawek "Mortifier" Arkhangelsky died in his sleep while on tour near Munchberg, Germany. His band members discovered him "lifeless" and called an ambulance, which unsuccessfully attempted to revive him. An autopsy revealed that the cause of death was cardiac arrhythmia. They released their ninth full-length album Crusade: Zero on January 30, 2015 through Napalm Records. The album was recorded at Efektura Studio in Warsaw, Poland and was dedicated to Mortifer.

The band released their tenth full-length album, Tremendum, on May 5, 2017 through Napalm Records. The album was recorded with Adam ATF on guitar/vocals and Pavulon on drums, with session guitars and bass by Dominik Prykiel and Paweł Michałowski respectively. It also features guest guitar solos from Dean Arnold of Vital Remains. The band announced that they would tour across Europe through May and June 2017 in support of the album.

Hate's eleventh studio album, Auric Gates of Veles, was released on June 14, 2019 through Metal Blade Records. The band's next album, Rugia, was released on October 15, 2021.

Band members

 Current members
Adam "ATF Sinner" Buszko – vocals, rhythm guitar 
 Dominik "Domin" Prykiel – lead guitar 
 Daniel "Nar-Sil" Rutkowski – drums 
 
 Current live members
 Tomasz "Tiermes" Sadlak – bass 

 Former members
Piotr "Mittloff" Kozieradzki – drums 
Andrzej "Quack" Kułakowski – lead guitar 
Marcin "Martin" Russak – bass, backing vocals 
Daniel – bass 
Ralph – lead guitar 
Cyprian Konador – bass 
Dariusz "Hellrizer" Zaborowski – drums 
Piotr "Kaos" Jeziorski – lead guitar 
Kamil "Hellbeast" Kondracki – lead guitar 
Konrad "Destroyer" Ramotowski – lead guitar 
Stanisław "Hexen" Malanowicz – drums 
Sławomir "Mortifer" Arkhangelsky – bass 
Paweł "Pavulon" Jaroszewicz – drums 

 Former live members
 Tomasz "Cyklon" Węglewski – bass 
 Łukasz "Lucas" Musiuk – lead guitar 
 Alexandra Arkhangelskaya – bass 
 Piotr "Kain" Kołakowski – bass 
 Paweł "Apeiron" Michałowski – bass 

 Session musicians
 Filip "Heinrich" Hałucha – bass

Timeline

Discography

Studio albums

Compilation albums

EPs

Video albums

Demos

Music videos

References

External links

 

1990 establishments in Poland
Metal Blade Records artists
Musical groups established in 1990
Polish death metal musical groups
Polish heavy metal musical groups
Polish musical trios